Montréal/Aéroparc Île Perrot  is  southwest of Montreal, Quebec, Canada.

See also
 List of airports in the Montreal area

References

Registered aerodromes in Montérégie
Vaudreuil-Soulanges Regional County Municipality